William Henry Johnson III (born July 9, 1944) is a former NFL football player with the New York Giants during the 1970s, as a punter. He played 11 games with the Giants during the 1970 NFL season.

References

1944 births
Living people
American football punters
West Alabama Tigers football players
New York Giants players
Players of American football from Alabama